Coming of Age is an American sitcom that aired on CBS in the United States for two seasons from 1988 to 1989.

Premise
Coming of Age features Paul Dooley and Phyllis Newman as Dick and Ginny Hale, who lived in a retirement community in Arizona.  Dick resented his retirement – a former airline pilot, he had been forced to retire by a Federal Aviation Administration rule that requires all U.S. commercial pilots to retire by age 60.  Dick hated almost everything about his retirement, including his surroundings.  He was appalled by the hot climate, the thin walls separating the Hale's apartment from that of their neighbors (Alan Young and Glynis Johns), and mostly by the contented attitude of the other residents including Pauline Spencer (Ruta Lee). Kevin Pollak played Brian Brinker, who ran the community but was very inept at his job, with Lenore Woodward playing his elderly and very nosy secretary Wilma Salzgaber. Brinker would also be a love interest to Dick and Ginny's daughter, another wrinkle about The Dunes which raised the ire of Dick.

This program was first aired as a midseason replacement in March 1988.  It was not well received and was pulled from the schedule after only three episodes were aired.  Nevertheless, it was added to the CBS 1988 fall lineup.  It failed again, and was quickly pulled from the schedule.  The airing of more episodes in June and July 1989 was a "burn-off", an attempt to recoup at least some of the investment in the show by using it as filler during the traditionally low-rated summer months.

Cast
Paul Dooley as Dick Hale
Phyllis Newman as Ginny Hale
Alan Young as Ed Pepper
Glynis Johns as Trudie Pepper
Kevin Pollak as Brian Brinker
Lenore Woodward as Wilma Salzgaber
Ruta Lee as Pauline Spencer

Episodes

Season 1 (1988)

Season 2 (1988–89)

References

General
Brooks, Tim, and Marsh, Earle, The Complete Directory to Prime Time Network and Cable TV Shows

External links
 

1988 American television series debuts
1989 American television series endings
1980s American sitcoms
CBS original programming
English-language television shows
Television series about marriage
Television series by Universal Television
Television shows set in Arizona
Television series about old age